Dustin's Bar Mitzvah was an English four-piece band from Acton, London. They are signed to Hungry Kid Records in the United Kingdom and Vinyl Junkie records in Japan. Dustin's Bar Mitzvah has achieved greater success in Japan, issuing a collection of demos entitled Dial M For Mitzvah and entering the Japanese singles chart. They played a sold out tour of Japan in January 2006. They have released three singles in the UK: "Jimmy White" / "Lucy", "To The Ramones" and "Kick Him Out". They released their debut album, Get Your Mood On, on 4 December 2006.

However, the band announced their decision to split up in April 2007 after drummer Desmond Wolfe decided to quit.

On 15 August 2011, they announced they were reforming for one gig at London's Lexington on 1 October.

Discography

Albums
Dial M For Mitzvah (Japan only) - November 2005
*Get Your Mood On - December 2006
Get Your Mood On (Japanese edition) - October 2006

Singles/EPs
 "Jimmy White" / "Lucy" - 4 April 2005
 "To The Ramones" - 20 February 2006
 "Kick Him Out" - 21 August 2006
 "I Love You So Much I've Been Sick on Myself" (released free online through official website) - 1 September 2011

References

External links
Official site
Dustin's Bar Mitzvah at MySpace

Musical groups from London
English indie rock groups